Anti-Creative Records was an independent record label in southern California. The label's releases consist primarily of folk-punk and punk  bands from across the United States. The label was founded in November 2004.

The label has released material from such notable bands as Defiance, Ohio and Ghost Mice.

Business practices 
Anti-Creative follows the DIY (do-it-yourself) punk ethic. The label likes to expand on this concept by saying they also consider themselves a "do-it-together" independent record label, stressing the importance of community and cooperation (as opposed to competition).

To help promote cooperation and collectivism, the label works closely with other labels with similar ideology as opposed to competing with them. In this way, they support small labels and encourage others to do so as well. The label is also intent on keeping music cheap and affordable ($5.00 USD or less for typical releases).

List of Bands 
Captain Chaos
Defiance, Ohio
Ghost Mice
imadethismistake
The Max Levine Ensemble
One Reason
Operation: Cliff Clavin
Pretty Hot
Saw Wheel

Discography 
ACR001 - One Reason/Defiance Ohio - Split 7" - Released November 15, 2004
ACR002 - Pretty Hot/Ghost Mice - Split CD - Released June 1, 2005
ACR003 - Captain Chaos - The Fool CD - Released March 12, 2007
ACR004 - imadethismistake - It's Okay 12" - Released August 1, 2008
ACR005 - Saw Wheel 7" - Released January 20, 2010

Anti-Creative Records also participated in the community-release of the Operation: Cliff Clavin/The Max Levine Ensemble split 7" that was released in 2005. The label has since sold out of their copies (other labels may still have available copies). For a number of years, the label indicated they would be releasing an album by Rio de la Muerte, which was later cancelled.

See also
DIY ethic
Folk punk
Indie music
List of record labels
Plan-It-X Records
Punk rock

External links
Official Website

American independent record labels
Folk punk
Record labels established in 2004
Punk record labels